Yavneh Academy of Dallas (now Akiba Yavneh Academy) is a coeducational, college preparatory Jewish private school in Dallas, Texas. It is guided by the tenets of Modern Orthodox Judaism. In 2019, the school merged with Akiba Academy of Dallas (preschool through grade 8) to become Akiba Yavneh Academy (3 months through 12th Grade). With a student body of more than 400 students from 3 months of age through 12th Grade for the 2021–22 academic year, Akiba Yavneh Academy has dual curriculum of General and Judaic Studies.

History
The school first opened in 1993. Yavneh was named after a now-defunct Jewish school in Cologne, Germany that closed during World War II, which itself was named for an ancient city and academy in Israel. Yavneh is Dallas's first Jewish high school, following the closing of Torah High School of Texas. Yavneh Academy opened in 1993 with grades 9 and 10 and phased in the other two grades in subsequent years. Initially classes were held at the Jewish Community Center in Dallas. Rabbi Moshe Englander was the first principal; he was previously the assistant principal of a Jewish high school near Detroit. When the school opened, the yearly tuition was $7,000. The school used donations to cover some of its operating expenses as well. Initially it had about 12 students. Circa 2004 it had 81 students, rising to about 100 in 2005.

Yavneh Academy occupied five temporary locations before settling into its permanent home, The Schultz Rosenberg Campus, named after the donors Howard and Leslie Schultz and Marcus and Ann Rosenberg. The school's current campus is at 12324 Merit Drive, covering . It shares a site with the campus of Akiba Academy, a PK-8 school; both of them opened their doors on the current campus in 2005. The site formerly housed the Olla Podrida Shopping Village, a shopping center which closed in 1996. The Schultzes had acquired the site and transferred it to the Greater Dallas Jewish Community Capital Campaign of the 21st Century as a donation. The demolition of the shopping center was scheduled to occur in 2003, with construction of the new campuses scheduled to begin in January of the following year.

The school, along with Akiba Academy of Dallas, was built with a $19 million bond issued by Colorado Educational and Cultural Facilities Authority (CEFCA) and underwritten by J.P. Morgan Securities Inc. On September 27, 2004, about 36 boxes of Jewish religious books were ceremonially buried at the school site.

Mr. Donald R. O'Quinn served as principal of the school from 1998 to 2012 following a career in the Dallas Independent School District. Dr. David A. Portnoy became Head of School in 2012, after serving as Head of School at Emery/Weiner School in Houston, Texas, and as a teacher and senior administrator at Beth Tfiloh Dahan Community School and Gilman School, both in Baltimore, Maryland. Following Dr. Portnoy's retirement in 2019, the school merged with Akiba Academy of Dallas (preschool through grade 8) to become Akiba Yavneh Academy. Beginning in 2019, the new Head of School is Rabbi Yaakov Green.

Athletics and Extracurricular Activities

Yavneh student-athletes have won numerous national tournaments, and its boys and girls soccer, volleyball, and basketball teams have advanced regularly to Texas state playoffs.  The Yavneh Boys Varsity Basketball Team - The Bulldogs - enjoyed a perfect 31–0 season in 2017–18, when they also won the second of back-to-back championships at the Beth Tfiloh Weiner International Invitational basketball tournament. In 2020, they won the Texas State TAPPS 3-A Championship.

In 2013, Yavneh's student newspaper, The Bulldog Print, was named the #1 student newspaper in the nation during the National High School Journalism Conference in San Antonio, Texas. Its Engineering Team, under the auspices of CIJE, was also awarded top national honors in 2017 and 2018. The school's Math Team has won #1 North Texas individual and team titles since 2016.

Beginning in 2016, the first year of the Niche (company) relevant ratings, Yavneh has been ranked in the Top 10 of Jewish High Schools nationally and Top 10 of Private High Schools in Dallas. It has been ranked the #1 Jewish High School in Texas, and has continued to be ranked in the Top 10 nationally and in DFW among a small number of other prominent schools, in 2017, 2018, and 2019.

Yavneh student leadership is perhaps best exemplified by student-run groups including "Students Against Terrorism," "Students 4 Students," and "Helping Hands for the Homeless," which have together raised more than $900,000 for victims of terror, for building schools in sub-Saharan Africa - together with the Hamels Foundation - and for aiding needy families in the Dallas-Fort Worth region.

College Admissions, Academics, and Alumni

Yavneh alumni have attended Yale University, Harvard University, Stanford University, The University of Pennsylvania, and many other colleges, universities, and yeshiva and seminary programs in Israel and around the world.

See also
 History of the Jews in Dallas

References

External links
 Akiba Yavneh Academy

Jewish schools in the United States
High schools in Dallas
Private high schools in Texas
1993 establishments in Texas
Educational institutions established in 1993